Giuseppe Nuvolo (born Vincenzo Nuvolo, also known as Fra' Nuvolo; 1570–1643) was an Italian architect, an exponent of the Mannerist and early Baroque architecture, active mostly in Naples.

He entered  the Dominican Order in 1591, but designed works also for other institutions. He specialized in the use of  majolica decorations, especially in the domes for churches in Naples, including that of  San Pietro Martire or that of Santa Maria della Sanità. Nuvolo designed both the church and convent of Santa Maria della Sanità.

Nuvolo also redesigned pre-existing edifices in Mannerist-Baroque style, such as the church of Santa Maria di Costantinopoli and the church of San Carlo all'Arena. At his death in 1643, he was working in the construction of the church of Santa Caterina da Siena, also in Naples.

Sources

1570 births
1643 deaths
Italian Baroque architects
Italian Dominicans